The Oceania Fencing Confederation (OFC) is the regional governing body of fencing within Oceania. They are responsible  for the development and promotion of fencing within Oceania.

Member Countries
The OFC has four member and two associate member countries

Member Countries
Australia
New Zealand
Guam
Samoa

Associate Member Countries
New Caledonia
Polynesia

References

External links

Sports governing bodies in Oceania